
Lämmerensee is a lake on Lämmerenalp in the municipality of Leukerbad in the canton of Valais, Switzerland. Its surface area is 6.7 ha. At an elevation of 2296 m, it is located below Lämmerengrat.

See also
List of mountain lakes of Switzerland

Lakes of Valais
Leukerbad